The Industrial School Group in Tăşnad is a blilngual high school in Tăşnad, Romania, with both Romanian and Hungarian language classes. It was established on September 1, 1958.

Former names
 ȘCOALA MEDIE (1958 - 1966-1967),
 LICEUL DE CULTURĂ GENERALĂ (1966-1967 - 1974-1975),
 LICEUL REAL- UMANIST (1975–1976),
 LICEUL INDUSTRIAL TĂȘNAD (1976–1989),
 LICEUL TEORETIC (1989–1992),
 GRUPUL ȘCOLAR INDUSTRIAL (after 1992)

References

External links
  GRUP ȘCOLAR INDUSTRIAL TĂȘNAD 

Educational institutions established in 1958
Tășnad
Schools in Satu Mare County
Bilingual schools
High schools in Romania
1958 establishments in Romania